Pascal Mfyomi (2 July 1942 – before 2006) was a Tanzanian athlete who competed in the 1964 Olympics in Tokyo in the men's 10,000 meter race.

References

1942 births
Year of death missing
Tanzanian male long-distance runners
Olympic athletes of Tanganyika
Athletes (track and field) at the 1964 Summer Olympics
Commonwealth Games competitors for Tanganyika
Athletes (track and field) at the 1962 British Empire and Commonwealth Games
Commonwealth Games competitors for Tanzania
Athletes (track and field) at the 1966 British Empire and Commonwealth Games